Daniel Alonso Sánchez Albújar (born 2 May 1990 in Lima) is a Peruvian footballer who plays for Comerciantes Unidos.

Club career
In 2007 Sanchez, were called along with 8 other U-20 players to the first team of Sporting Cristal. After his participation in the U17 WC, Sanchez started gaining caps in the first team of Sporting Cristal. Sanchez made his debut right after the WC ended for Peru and he became in 2008 a regular member of the starting line-up of the team. Sanchez, who wears the 23 jersey, has a brilliant future, and has contributed a lot to his team. "Dani" is still young, but has scored many excellent goals in the 2008 season. One of the best ones so far, is the one he scored against Universitario de Deportes when Sporting Cristal beat 2-1 la U in Monumental Stadium. Sanchez will continue in Sporting Cristal, but it seems like he will soon emigrate to Europe.

On June 9, 2011 it was announced that Daniel transferred to Peruvian team C.D. Universidad César Vallejo.

International career
He was also part of the Peru U-17 team that reached the quarterfinal stage at the 2007 FIFA U-17 World Cup played in South Korea. Now Sanchez is a player that could end up later in Europe and it's about to represent Peru in the next U20 South American Championship.

References

External links

1990 births
Living people
Footballers from Lima
Peruvian footballers
Association football midfielders
Sporting Cristal footballers
Club Deportivo Universidad César Vallejo footballers
Ayacucho FC footballers
Serrato Pacasmayo players
León de Huánuco footballers
Sport Loreto players
Coronel Bolognesi footballers
Sport Victoria players
Comerciantes Unidos footballers
Peruvian Primera División players